A cousin is the child of one's aunt or uncle, or a more distant relative who shares a common ancestor. It may also refer to:
Cousin Island, a small granitic island of the Seychelles
The Cousin (Italian: La cugina), 1974 drama film by Aldo Lado
Cousin Cousine, a 1975 French-language film which tells the story of cousins-by-marriage who have an affair
Cousins (1989 film), its English-language remake
Cousin prime, a pair of prime numbers that differ by four
Cousin problems, two math questions in several complex variables, concerning the existence of meromorphic functions
Protolampra sobrina, a noctuid moth of Britain known as the cousin german

Specific "cousins" include:
Cousin Bette (La Cousine Bette), an 1846 novel by Honoré de Balzac that was made into a 1998 movie starring Jessica Lange
Cousin Brucie, a nickname for radio personality Bruce Morrow
"Cousin Dupree", a song by Steely Dan from their 2000 album Two Against Nature
Cousin Henry, a novel by Anthony Trollope in 1879
Cousin Joe, a blues and jazz singer born in 1907
Cousin Itt, a member of the fictional Addams Family in the 1964 television series
Cousin Oliver, a character on The Brady Bunch, and a metaphor to denote the decision to add a cute child actor to the cast of a television program to improve its ratings
Cousin Skeeter, a comedy television show which ran on Nickelodeon from 1998 to 2001
Cousin Tuny, an American radio personality who was popular in the 1960s

Surname 
People named Cousin as a surname include:
Alan Cousin, Scottish footballer.
Aurelien Cousin, Maltese water polo player.
Daniel Cousin, Gabonese footballer.
Ertharin Cousin, American ambassador.
Victor Cousin, a French philosopher born in 1792.

See also
Cousins (disambiguation)